Caroline Garcia and Kristina Mladenovic were the defending champions, but chose not to participate this year.

Bethanie Mattek-Sands and Lucie Šafářová won the title, defeating Lucie Hradecká and Kateřina Siniaková in the final, 6–1, 4–6, [10–7].

Seeds

Draw

External links 
 Main draw

Volvo Car Open - Doubles
Charleston Open